BNL Rocks Red Rocks is the third official live album from Canadian band Barenaked Ladies. The album was formally announced on 1 February 2016 via the band's official Twitter page  and was released on 20 May 2016. It was recorded at Red Rocks Amphitheatre to promote the release of Silverball on the Last Summer on Earth 2015 tour, The band held a Last Summer on Earth 2016 tour with Orchestral Manoeuvres in the Dark and Howard Jones in conjunction with the new live album. This is the band's first commercial live release other than those received by fans at shows since the departure of Steven Page in 2009.

An instant download of "Odds Are" from the album was provided for those who purchased tickets to the Last Summer on Earth 2016 tour. Ticket buyers also received a download of the full album upon its release.

The album was made available for pre-order on 8 April 2016. Those who pre-ordered the album received an instant download of "The Old Apartment", "Odds Are", "Gonna Walk" and "One Week". The band also uploaded videos of these performances on their official YouTube channel, with the exception of "One Week", which received an official lyric video.

Track listing

Songs performed but not included are "Say What You Want", "Matter of Time" and "Did I Say That Out Loud?".

Personnel
Barenaked Ladies
Ed Robertson – Acoustic guitar, electric guitar, lead vocals, backup vocals
Tyler Stewart – Drums, percussion, backup vocals, lead vocal on "Drawing" and "Rock and Roll"
Jim Creeggan – Double bass, electric bass, backup vocals
Kevin Hearn – Accordion, acoustic guitar, electric guitar, electric piano, keyboards, piano, synthesizer, backup vocals, lead vocal on "Passcode"

Additional musicians
Colin Hay – Acoustic guitar and lead vocal on "Who Can It Be Now?"
Blaise Garza – Saxophone on "Who Can It Be Now?"

Production
Produced by Barenaked Ladies
Mixed by Lenny Derose, assisted by Alex Krotz
Mastered by Harry Hess at Hbomb Mastering
Package design: Chris Bilheimer
Direction: Alison Taylor, Atwork Management
US booking agent: Larry Webman, Paradigm Agency
Business management: Kenna Danyliw & Mann

Charts

References

Barenaked Ladies live albums
Barenaked Ladies video albums
2016 live albums
Vanguard Records live albums
Live video albums
2016 video albums
Vanguard Records video albums